{{DISPLAYTITLE:C15H17NO}}
The molecular formula C15H17NO (molar mass: 227.30 g/mol, exact mass: 227.1310 u) may refer to:

 PPPA, or 3-phenoxy-3-phenylpropan-1-amine
 Prodan

Molecular formulas